EFM
may refer to:
 E FM, a radio channel in Sri Lanka
 Canon EF-M lens mount
 Canon EF-M camera
 Edinburgh Dragon Trust, a British investment trust
 Education for Ministry, an American Christian educational program
 EFM Academy, now part of SCOPE Maastricht, a study association in the Netherlands
 EFM Records, an American record label
 Eight-to-fourteen modulation
 Electronic fetal monitoring
 Electrostatic force microscope
 Enterprise feedback management
 Environmental Fluid Mechanics, a scholarly journal
 Ethernet in the first mile
 European Film Market, a film market held during the Berlin International Film Festival
 The FM extended band in Brazil, abbreviated eFM